Theodore Pringle Loblaw (July 1, 1872 – April 2, 1933) was a Canadian grocer. Loblaw founded the Loblaws chain of grocery stores, which is now a nationwide retail empire.

Biography
Loblaw was born in Elmgrove, northeast of Alliston, the son of William James Loblaw and Isabella Stevenson Loblaw. After his parents' deaths during his adolescence, Loblaw was raised by his maternal grandparents, William and Elizabeth Stevenson, at their farm just outside Alliston. In the 1890s he headed to Toronto to begin his career in retail grocery. He later settled in Mimico and eventually purchased his grandparents' farm.

Loblaw married Isabella Adam in 1897. The Loblaws had no biological children and were survived by their grand niece (Jean Agnes Loblaw 1917-1993) and nephews (Alexander Burr-Loblaw (1904-1978), John Burr-Loblaw (1906-1972) and James Fraser Burr-Loblaw (1910-1986).

Loblaw died at Toronto Western Hospital on April 2, 1933 and buried at Alliston Union Cemetery in Alliston, Ontario.

Creating Loblaws Groceteria
In 1919 Loblaw was hired by the United Farmers Cooperative Company (the purchasing agent of the United Farmers of Ontario co-operative) having previously co-managed a grocery store.  He was involved in an unsuccessful attempt by the UFCC to launch a chain of cooperative grocery stores; he left the company and used the experience he had gained to found the grocery chain that bears his name.

Toronto Western Hospital 
Loblaw was also instrumental in the establishment of the Toronto Western Hospital, as well as of the Stevenson Memorial Hospital in Alliston, which was named in honour of his grandparents.

References

External links
 Stevenson Memorial Hospital: History

1872 births
1933 deaths
Canadian company founders
Members of the United Church of Canada
Canadian people of Scottish descent
Retail company founders
Businesspeople from Ontario
people from Simcoe County